This Time is the fourth studio album by Jazz vocalist Al Jarreau, released in 1980 on Warner Bros. Records. The release marked a change in Jarreau's sound to a more R&B-oriented flavor. As a result, the album achieved more success on the mainstream charts than his previous works, while also topping the Jazz Charts. It also reached No. 6 on the R&B charts and No. 27 on the Billboard 200." In 1981 "Never Givin' Up" gave Jarreau a Grammy Award nomination for Best R&B Vocal Performance, Male.

This Time marked Jarreau's first foray into the top 40 on the Hot 200 or top 10 on the R&B charts, as well as his first No. 1 on the Jazz charts. His next album would prove even more successful, topping both the Jazz and R&B charts.

Track listing

Charts & Awards

Album

Charting Singles

"Never Givin' Up" received a Grammy Award nomination for Best R&B Vocal Performance, Male in 1981, Jarreau's first nomination in the R&B field. It lost to Jarreau's Warner Bros. labelmate George Benson for the Give Me the Night album, who had recently undergone a similar change in sound.

Personnel 
 Al Jarreau – lead vocals, backing vocals (1, 2, 3, 5, 7), vocal percussion (1, 4), rhythm arrangements (1-4, 7, 8, 9)
 Greg Mathieson – rhythm arrangements (1), acoustic piano (1), string synthesizer (1, 3, 4, 5)
 Jay Graydon – synthesizer programming (1, 2, 3, 5, 8), electric guitar (1, 2, 3, 5, 7, 8), rhythm arrangements (2, 3, 4, 7, 8, 9)
 Tom Canning – rhythm arrangements (1, 2, 5, 8), Fender Rhodes (2, 4, 5, 8), acoustic piano (3, 5, 8), bells (8)
 David Foster – acoustic piano (2), Fender Rhodes (3, 9)
 Michael Omartian – string synthesizer (2, 8)
 Larry Williams – synthesizers (3, 6, 8), Fender Rhodes (6)
 Steve George – synthesizers (7)
 George Duke – Fender Rhodes (8)
 Oscar Castro-Neves – acoustic guitar (1)
 Dean Parks – electric guitar (3, 5)
 Earl Klugh – acoustic guitar (9), rhythm arrangements (9)
 Abraham Laboriel – bass guitar 
 Ralph Humphrey – drums (1, 4, 5, 9), percussion (4)
 Carlos Vega – drums (2, 3)
 Steve Gadd – drums (6, 7, 8)
 Earl Lon Price – saxophones (7)
 Bill Reichenbach Jr. – trombone (3, 7)
 Chuck Findley – trumpet (3, 7)
 Jerry Hey – horn arrangements (1, 3, 7), flugelhorn (1, 2, 7, 8), trumpet (3, 7)
 Tom Kellock – rhythm arrangements (3)
 Les Thompson – harmonica solo (5)

Production 
 Producer – Jay Graydon
 Engineers – Joe Bogan and Jay Graydon
 Second Engineer – Debbie Thompson
 Recorded at Dawnbreaker Studios (San Fernando, CA).
 Remixed and Overdubbed at Garden Rake Studios (Sherman Oaks, CA).
 Mastered by Bernie Grundman at A&M Mastering Studios (Los Angeles, CA).
 Art Direction – Richard Seireeni
 Cover Photography – Richard Avedon
 Sleeve Photography – Michael Rice and Susan Jarreau
 Still Life – Harry Mittman

References

Al Jarreau albums
1980 albums
Warner Records albums